Halfaya Sollum War Cemetery is a burial ground for military personnel who died in Egypt and Libya during the Second World War. It is located in Egypt, near the border with Libya. It is administered by the Commonwealth War Graves Commission. There are 2,046 military personnel of the Second World War interred in the cemetery, including 238 that remain unidentified.

History
There was extensive fighting between Allied and Axis forces in Egypt and Libya during the Western Desert campaign from 1940 to 1942. After the war, several interments from the battlefield and nearby locations, including Fort Capuzzo, Bardia, Minquar el Zannan, and Camerons Burial Ground were consolidated to Halfaya Sollum War Cemetery.

Cemetery

The Halfaya Sollum War Cemetery is located in Sollum, Egypt, on the coastal road running between Mersa Matruh and Libya. Laid out in a rectangular form, the cemetery's main entrance is along the east wall. A Cross of Sacrifice is centrally located and aligned with a Stone of Remembrance positioned against the west wall. Shelters are provided on the opposing north and south walls, with two more shelters on the west wall, on either side of the Stone of Remembrance.

The cemetery contains the remains of 2,046 military personnel, all from the Second World War. Most are from the period 1940 to 1942, while there are a few soldiers that died in 1943 and 1944. The majority of the identified interments are British, with 367 South Africans, 178 New Zealanders, 169 Australians, 141 Indians, eleven Canadians and two Greek military personnel also buried there. Notable burials in the cemetery include Colonel Graham Lyall, a First World War recipient of the Victoria Cross who was serving with the Royal Army Ordnance Corps when he died of a heart attack in November 1941, and Squadron Leader Derek Ward, a New Zealand flying ace who served with the Royal Air Force. He was killed in June 1942.

Notes

References

External links
 

Commonwealth War Graves Commission cemeteries in Egypt
Cemeteries in Egypt
World War II cemeteries